Zoanthus sansibaricus is a species of zoanthid generally found in the Indo-pacific but also off the western coast of South America. The range of habitation has been noted in intertidal zones along with areas below 7 m, but shows phenotypical and morphological differences based on depth and shading. Shaded individuals contain larger polyps compared to unshaded. It can be divided into three reproductive categories, male, female and asexual. Spawning has been observed within the middle of July, using lunar phases as an indicator. Various subclades are theorized to appear based on the time of year.

Gallery

References 

Zoanthus
Animals described in 1900